Henry Judson Hooper (January 13, 1883February 28, 1904) was an American football player.

Biography
Hooper was born on January 13, 1883, in Exeter, New Hampshire.

He played college football for the Dartmouth Big Green football and was selected as a consensus All-American at the center position as a freshman in 1903.

In February 1904, Hooper developed appendicitis. He underwent surgery at the Mary Hitchcock Hospital in Hanover, New Hampshire, and died there a short time later. He was 21 years old at the time of his death.

References

1883 births
1904 deaths
All-American college football players
American football centers
Dartmouth Big Green football players
People from Exeter, New Hampshire
Players of American football from New Hampshire
Sportspeople from Rockingham County, New Hampshire